Singanallur Lake is a lake in Singanallur, Coimbatore, South India. It is one of the 9 large lakes in the city.

Hydrography
The lake is fed by canals derived from Noyyal river. The lake also receives water from Sanganur drain and sewage water. The water can be released through two sluice gates on the lake. In 2010, pipes were laid to connecting the lake to Valankulam Lake to drain excess water during floods.

Flora and fauna

Eichornia crassipes is the main aquatic plant species causing eutrophication of the lake. The insect species  included four orders Orthoptera, Coleoptera, Hemiptera and Odonata.

The lake supports a rich bio-diversity consisting of plankton, butterflies, resident and migratory birds. Various species of butterflies including common Mormon, joker butterfly, glassy tiger and plain tiger have been spotted in the lake. Over 110 species of birds have been spotted in the lake. The spot-billed pelican, painted stork, openbill stork, ibis, Indian spot-billed duck, teal and black-winged stilt visit the lake during their migration. Various families of birds recorded include cormorants, herons, storks, ibis, kites, ducks, francolin, crakes, jacanas, plovers, sandpipers, terns, doves and pigeons, parakeet, cuckoos, owls, swifts, kingfishers, bee-eaters, rollers, barbets, woodpeckers, larks, swallows, wagtails, shrikes, bulbul, robin, babblers, warblers, flycatchers, flowerpecker, sunbirds, munias, sparrows, weavers, myna, orioles, drongos and crows.

Fishing
Fishing is carried out by local fishermen and enthusiasts. In the 2000s, due to encroachment and the fishes were infected with metals and pathogens from polluted waste water discharged from the sewage.

Transport
A railway track connecting  and  passes over the lake.

Environmental concerns
In 2006, the lake was encroached by water hyacinth and contaminated due to effluents released into the lake. In 2014, Coimbatore Corporation unveiled a plan to clear the encroachments and use the lake for recreation. In January 2015, the lake was cleared and made ready for commercial tourism purposes.

Recreation
Singanallur boat house was opened in 2005 and was closed in 2009 due to poor maintenance. In 2014, after the Coimbatore Corporation plan to de-silt the lake, the boat house was renovated. The Government of Tamil Nadu will introduce water sports and boating on the lake. Despite the increased inflow of tourists since renovation, tourists complain of unavailability of boats.

See also 
List of birds of Singanallur lake

References 

Lakes of Coimbatore
Kaveri River